The General Council of French Guiana (French: Conseil général de la Guyane) was the deliberative executive assembly of the French Department of French Guiana. (French Guiana was also a French region, with a Regional Council, the Regional Council of French Guiana, as well). 

The General Council was chaired by the President of the General Council of French Guiana. Alain Tien-Liong, of the DVG, held the presidency of the General Council from 2008 to the abolition of the department in 2015.

External links
General Council (French)

Former legislatures of Overseas France
Guiana
Government of French Guiana
Politics of French Guiana
Political organizations based in French Guiana